Cary Building may refer to:

 Cary Building (Detroit)
 Cary Building (New York City)